Obe or OBE may refer to:

People 

 Obe Blanc (born 1985), American wrestler
 Obe Geia (born 1989), Australian rugby league player
 Amir Obè, stage name of American rapper and producer Amir Obeid (born 1989)
 Tunde and Wunmi Obe, Nigerian show business couple
 Yumi Obe (born 1975), Japanese former football player and manager

Places 
 Obe (Afghanistan), a town in Herat Province
 Obe District, a district in the northeast of Herat Province, Afghanistan

Education
 Outcome-based education, an educational philosophy
 Ottawa Board of Education, the public school board for Ottawa, Ontario, Canada

Other uses
 Officer of the Order of the British Empire (post-nominal: OBE),  a grade of the British order of chivalry
 Obe language, a language of Nigeria
 Off-budget enterprise, a type of government body
 Out-of-body experience, an altered state of sensory perception
 Out-of-box experience, an aspect of consumer experience of a product
 Original Black Entertainment TV, a British-based television network that operated between 2003 and 2011
 OBE, IATA airport code for Okeechobee County Airport, Florida, United States